The Battle of Wolkowisk took place 14-16 November 1812 near the village of Wolkowisk, where 35,000 Austrian, Saxon and French soldiers under Karl Philipp, Prince of Schwarzenberg defeated 27,000 Russian soldiers under Fabian Gottlieb von der Osten-Sacken.

Background
Prince Schwarzenberg was under the constraints of secret agreements between Vienna and St. Petersburg to give as little help as possible to Napoleon.

Battle 
Sacken had taken Wolkowisk on 14 November and driven off Jean Reynier's troops but could not destroy this part of the French army. Schwarzenberg on the 15 November marched to Wolkowisk and left 6,500 men to protect Slonim. The Austrians attacked  Sacken's troops on the 16 November. Now the Russians were attacked on three sides but they were able to extricate themselves and Sacken finally withdrew toward Brest.

Aftermath 
Schwarzenberg followed Sacken but Maret ordered him to go to Minsk at once. Schwarzenberg obeyed reluctantly but later on he even did not continue his march to Minsk as the more than 300 km from Wolkovisk to Borisov and the Beresina led through poor country and increasingly deteriorating weather. He might have been able to block Tshitshagov but instead Schwarzenberg's 40,000 men did not support Napoleon at the Beresina.

See also
List of battles of the French invasion of Russia

Notes

References

External links
 

Battles of the French invasion of Russia
Battles of the Napoleonic Wars
Battles involving Russia
Battles involving France
Conflicts in 1812
November 1812 events
19th century in the Russian Empire
1812 in the Russian Empire